Zenochloris densepunctata is a species of beetle in the family Cerambycidae. It was described by Ernst Fuchs in 1976.

References

Trachyderini
Beetles described in 1976